Gordon Earl Cole (June 18, 1833 – October 4, 1890) was a lawyer and Republican politician who served as Minnesota Attorney General from 1860 to 1866.

Early life and education
Cole was born in Cheshire, Massachusetts in 1833. He attended Suffield Academy and later studied law at several different schools and law offices in New York including under George N. Briggs. He graduated from Harvard Law School in 1854 and opened a law practice in his hometown of Cheshire shortly thereafter.

Career in Minnesota Territory
In 1855, he married Stella C. Whipple. The two relocated to Minnesota Territory a year later, settling in Faribault, Minnesota. Cole pursued his legal career, living in Faribault and occasionally traveling to Minneapolis and St. Paul for trials. He developed a specialty working with cases related to railroads and government land grants.

Cole was also involved in the state's Republican politics. He served three terms as Minnesota Attorney General from 1860 to 1866 and two terms in the Minnesota State Legislature, winning election to the Minnesota Senate in 1864 and to the Minnesota House of Representatives in 1882. He also served on a variety of state agencies and boards and as mayor of Faribault for a single term. In 1884, he ran unsuccessfully against Dwight M. Sabin for United States Senate.

Death
Cole became ill in 1890 and traveled to Europe with his daughter to seek medical treatment in Germany. He died in London while en route on October 4, 1890.

Notes

1833 births
1890 deaths
Members of the Minnesota House of Representatives
Minnesota state senators
Minnesota Attorneys General
Harvard Law School alumni
People from Cheshire, Massachusetts
19th-century American politicians